The Rupperswil murder case refers to the discovery of four bodies after a house fire in Rupperswil, Aargau in Switzerland on December 21, 2015. It is one of the most notable crime cases in recent Swiss history, particularly for the cold-blooded manner in which the crime was carried out. The perpetrator was found guilty in March 2018 and sentenced to life imprisonment.

Events
On December 21, 2015, firemen were called to a fire in a house in Rupperswil, a community with about 5,000 inhabitants in the Canton of Aargau, Switzerland. Four bodies were located at the site, and soon it became clear that the four people had been killed before the fire broke out. A five months long investigation finally concluded on May 12, 2016, when a suspect was apprehended in the nearby town of Aarau.

The victims were Carla Schauer-Freiburghaus, 48 years old, her two sons Davin (13) and Dion (19) and Dion's girlfriend, Simona F. (21). The murderer, Thomas Nick, a 33-year-old student, entered the family's house after the mother's partner left. By threatening Davin, he made his mother tie up Dion and Simona, and demanded money. After the mother returned from the bank, he sexually abused the younger child, and then killed the victims by slashing their throats. After setting fire to the house, he left.

The police of the Canton of Aargau offered a previously unheard-of sum of 100,000 Swiss Francs as a reward for information. For five months, the killer remained elusive, but he was finally apprehended after a thorough investigation. Traces of his DNA as well as his fingerprints were identified at the crime location, and he gave a comprehensive confession. He lived with his mother in the same town, was known for owning two Huskies, and spent much time training and coordinating the football youth in his area. He did not know the victims beforehand and may have sought them out because the family had a 13-year-old son.

When he was apprehended, the police found cable ties, adhesive tape, an old Swiss army ordnance pistol (Pistole 1900/06/29, a version of the Luger pistol) as well as prepared handcuffs made from rope. These were interpreted as a sign that he planned future crimes of a similar nature.

In March 2018, Thomas Nick was found guilty by the district court in Lenzburg, in the canton of Argau, Switzerland, of murder, extortion, hostage-taking, sexual assault, sexual acts with a child, and arson, among other counts. He was sentenced to life imprisonment.

References

External links
http://www.nzz.ch/panorama/vierfaches-toetungsdelikt-taeter-von-rupperswil-plante-weitere-morde-ld.82461 (German)

December 2015 crimes in Europe
Mass murder in Switzerland
2015 in Switzerland
2015 murders in Switzerland
December 2015 events in Switzerland